The Von Hoffman House at Broadway and 5th St. in Medora, North Dakota was built in 1884.   It was listed on the National Register of Historic Places in 1977.  The listing included one contributing building and one contributing structure.

Known also as the Medora Doll House, it is a common-bond brick house that is a work of Peter Book, who owned and operated a Medora brick factory in the mid-1880s. Peter Book was also a builder of St. Mary's Catholic Church, which is also NRHP-listed.

The home was commissioned by the Marquis de Mores for Louis von Hoffmann and Athenais von Hoffman, the parents of his wife Medora von Hoffmann.

See also
De Mores Packing Plant Ruins, also NRHP-listed

References

Houses on the National Register of Historic Places in North Dakota
Houses completed in 1884
Houses in Billings County, North Dakota
National Register of Historic Places in Billings County, North Dakota
1884 establishments in Dakota Territory